Heinz Woester (1901–1970) was a Swiss film and television actor.

Filmography

References

External links

1901 births
1970 deaths
Swiss male film actors
20th-century Swiss male actors